Olav Djupvik (5 February 1931 – 31 May 2016) was a Norwegian politician with the Christian Democratic Party.

He was born in Blaker as a teacher's son, and spent his professional career as a schoolteacher in Oslo, Askim, Rendalen and Lillehammer. He was a member of the executive committee of Lillehammer city council from 1971 to 1979.

He was elected to the Norwegian Parliament from Oppland in 1977, but was not re-elected in 1981.

References

1931 births
2016 deaths
Norwegian schoolteachers
Members of the Storting
Oppland politicians
Christian Democratic Party (Norway) politicians
Norwegian Lutherans
University of Oslo alumni
Politicians from Lillehammer
20th-century Norwegian politicians
20th-century Lutherans